Xia Gong (1872–?) was a politician of the Republic of China. He was the Supreme Member of the Japanese puppet government, Northern Shanxi Autonomous Government (Jinbei Zizhi Zhengfu). Later he was appointed Vice-Chairman of the Mongolian United Autonomous Government. He was born in Datong County, Shanxi province.

Biography 
In the end of Qing dynasty, he became a Juren. Later he successively held the positions of teacher of junior high school and governor of county.

In 1937, the Imperial Japanese Army occupied Datong. Xia Gong was invited by the Japanese to organize the Peace Preservation Council in Northern Shanxi. In October the Northern Shanxi Autonomous Government was established, and he was appointed its Supreme Member.

In November 1937, the Mongolian United League Autonomous Government, the Southern Chahar Autonomous Government (Chanan Zizhi Zhengfu) and the Northern Shanxi Autonomous Government held a representative assembly in Zhangjiakou. Then the Mengjiang United Committee was established, Xia Gong and Ma Yongkui was appointed a General Member.

In September 1939, the three autonomous governments merged into the Mongolian United Autonomous Government, Xia Gong was appointed its Vice-Chairman. The following January, he resigned his post, and became an executive head of the Datong Colliery Co., Ltd.

According to Xu (2007), p. 1132, Xia Gong died in 1941. But according to the articles of Asahi Shimbun, he had been still alive in 1943. After 1944, the whereabouts of Xia Gong remained unknown.

References

Footnotes 
 
 
 

Republic of China politicians from Shanxi
Chinese collaborators with Imperial Japan
1872 births
Politicians from Datong
Year of death missing
Qing dynasty people
Educators from Shanxi